David George Green (born 24 January 1951) is the chief executive of the British think tank Civitas, which he founded in 2000. He is an author who also writes for British newspapers, including The Times, The Sunday Times, the Daily Mail, the Sunday Telegraph and The Daily Telegraph, and has taken part in broadcast programmes such as Newsnight, the Moral Maze and Today. He has made occasional contributions to The Guardians Comment is Free site, and he has contributed pieces to The Daily Telegraph news blogs.

Early life
Green was born in Thetford, England in 1951 and brought up in Norfolk and Lancashire. He attended the state-run boarding grammar school, Wymondham College, from 1962 until 1969.

Education and career
He was an undergraduate at the University of Newcastle upon Tyne from 1970 to 1973 and remained there for his PhD. He was a Labour councillor in Newcastle upon Tyne from 1976 until 1981 before leaving the UK to work as a Research Fellow at the Australian National University in Canberra for the next two years. He worked at the Institute of Economic Affairs from 1984, and was Director of its Health and Welfare Unit from 1986 to 2000. He has been the chief executive of the think tank Civitas since 2000.

His book, Community Without Politics (London, IEA, 1997) was awarded the Sir Antony Fisher Memorial Prize in 1997. In 2004 he was voted one of Britain's top 100 British intellectuals by readers of Prospect Magazine. And in 2009 he was included on the Evening Standard's list of the 1,000 most influential Londoners. His 1993 book, Reinventing Civil Society has been translated into Chinese and Russian.

Publications

Green, David, Power and Party in an English City, Allen & Unwin, 1980
Green, David and Cromwell, Larry, Mutual Aid or Welfare State, Allen & Unwin, 1984
Green, David, Working Class Patients and the Medical Establishment, Temple Smith/Gower, 1985
Green, David, The New Right: The Counter Revolution in Political, Economic and Social Thought, Wheatsheaf, 1987
Green, David, Reinventing Civil Society, IEA, 1993
Green, David, Community Without Politics: A Market Approach to Welfare Reform, IEA, 1996
Green, David, Benefit Dependency: How Welfare Undermines Independence, IEA, 1998
Green, David, An End to Welfare Rights: The Rediscovery of Independence, IEA, 1999
Green, David and Casper, Laura, Delay, Denial and Dilution, IEA, 1999
Green, David, Stakeholder Health Insurance, Civitas, 2000
Green, David, 'The Neo-Liberal Perspective' in The Student's Companion to Social Policy (2nd ed, Blackwell, 2003).
Green, David, Grove, Emma and Martin, Nadia, Crime and Civil Society: Can we become a more law-abiding people?, Civitas, 2005
Green, David, We're (Nearly) all Victims Now: how political correctness is undermining our liberal culture, Civitas, 2006
Green, David, Individualists Who Co-operate: Education and welfare reform befitting a free people, Civitas, 2009
Green, David, Prosperity With Principles: Some Policies For Economic Growth, Civitas, 2010

References

External links
  Civitas
 

1951 births
British male journalists
Living people
British chief executives
Alumni of Newcastle University
Academic staff of the Australian National University